Jayson Timatua (born 27 December 1998) is a Vanuatuan footballer who plays as a midfielder for Tafea and the Vanuatu national football team.

He has also been capped at the under-17 and under-20 levels.

References

External links

1998 births
Living people
Vanuatuan footballers
Vanuatu international footballers
Association football midfielders
Vanuatu youth international footballers
Vanuatu under-20 international footballers
Shepherds United F.C. players